Prince Sauryavong Savang (22 January 1937 – 2 January 2018) was the youngest son of King Savang Vatthana of Laos. In 1965, he married Princess Dalavan and they had four children, Sthira Sauryavong, Dayavant Sauryavong, Balavant Sauryavong, and Krishnajina Sauryavong.

Control of the Kingdom of Laos was seized by communist forces in August 1975.  In November 1975, the Prince escaped from Laos by swimming across the Mekong river to Thailand.  He was head of the Laotian royal family and acted as Regent to his nephew Crown Prince Soulivong Savang.

Prior to leaving Laos, he headed the Office of Crown Properties.  He died in Paris, France and worked for Renault.

In September 1997, he and his nephews Crown Prince Soulivong Savang and Prince Thayavong Savang initiated a Royal Lao Conference in Seattle, United States, over three hundred Lao exiles and representatives of the Hmong community. A resolution was established at this historic meeting between the Lao and Hmong leaders and the Royal Family and it held the common goal to change "the totalitarian regime to a genuine democratic system", and "the reunification of the Lao people".

In July 2000, he came under harsh criticism from some quarters after allegedly ordering the Vang Tao raid; he denied prior knowledge of the military attack against the Communist government of Laos.

He worked along with other surviving members of the Laos Royal Family such as Prince Mangkra Souvannaphouma, Crown Prince Soulivong Savang and Prince Thayavong Savang to establish a Constitutional Monarchy in Laos.

He died in Paris on 2 January 2018.

Quotes
 "The fact that the anti-communist fighters called for the return of the Constitutional Monarchy makes an excellent path for the restoration of Liberty, Peace and Democracy in the country."
 "Once a dialogue has been established, we can discuss how democracy and freedom should be restored in Laos"

External links
Photographs of Royal Family of Laos
Laos Royals offers to return to restore order
Press release of the Lao Royal Family
Laos Royals pay respects to September 11, 2001 Victims (Photos)
STADE ACTUEL DU PROJET (French)

1937 births
2018 deaths
Laotian royalty
Laotian exiles
Laotian anti-communists
People from Luang Prabang
Sons of kings